7 Rathrikal is a Malayalam language Indian television soap opera that airs on the entertainment channel Asianet and streams on Hotstar. .

Cast

Latha Raju
Jesey
Alummoodan
Chachappan
Kaduvakulam Antony
Kamaladevi
Kedamangalam Ali
Kuttan Pillai
Master Pramod
N. Govindankutty
Nellikode Bhaskaran

Soundtrack
The songs and background music was composed by Salil Chowdhury. Shantha P. Nair composed the song Makkathu Poyvarum. All song lyrics were written by Vayalar Ramavarma.

References

External links
 

1968 films
1960s Malayalam-language films
Films scored by Salil Chowdhury
Films directed by Ramu Kariat